Ratekau is a municipality in the district of Ostholstein, in Schleswig-Holstein, Germany. It is situated approximately 10 km northeast of Lübeck.

It is the place where Blücher surrendered after the Battle of Lübeck in 1806.

The village is best known for its well preserved fieldstone church St Vicelin of 1156.

References

Ostholstein